August Sirro (1883 Virumaa – ?) was an Estonian politician. He was a member of IV Riigikogu.

References

1883 births
Members of the Riigikogu, 1929–1932
Members of the Riigikogu, 1932–1934
Year of death missing